A West Country derby is a sporting fixture involving teams from the West Country, in England.

Football
The term has been used to describe matches between any two of the following clubs:
Bath City, Bristol City, Bristol Rovers,  Cheltenham Town, Exeter City,  Forest Green Rovers, Plymouth Argyle, Swindon Town, Taunton Town, Torquay United, Weymouth and Yeovil Town.

Rugby
West Country derby is also a phrase used in rugby, one of the fiercest rivalries is between Bath and Gloucester.

Another rivalry in this category is between the Bristol Bears and the Exeter Chiefs

Cricket
Games between Somerset and Gloucestershire can be referred to as a West Country derby.

References

England football derbies